Uncial 093 (in the Gregory-Aland numbering), is a Greek uncial manuscript of the New Testament, dated palaeographically to the 6th century. Formerly it was designated by siglum ל.

Description 

The codex contains a small parts of the Acts 24:22-25:5, and 1 Pet 2:22-24; 3:1,3-7, on two parchment leaves (25 cm by 18 cm). According to C. R. Gregory it has 1½ leaves.

The text is written in two columns per page, 24 lines per page, in uncial letters. It is a palimpsest, the upper text is in Hebrew.

The Greek text of this codex is a representative of the Byzantine text-type in the Acts, and the Alexandrian text-type in 1 Peter. Aland placed it in Category V in Acts, and in Category II in 1 Peter.

Currently it is dated by the INTF to the 6th-century.

It was found in Cairo in genizah. It was examined by C. Taylor.

The codex now is located in the Cambridge University Library as a part of the Taylor-Schechter Collection (12,189; 12,208) in Cambridge.

See also 

 List of New Testament uncials
 Biblical manuscript
 Textual criticism

References

Further reading 

 C. Taylor, Hebrew Greek Cairo Genizah Palimpsest from the Taylor-Schechter Collection including a fragment of the twenty-second Psalm according to Origen's Hexapla (Cambridge: 1900), pp. 94–96.

Greek New Testament uncials
6th-century biblical manuscripts
Palimpsests
Manuscripts in Cambridge